Independence Day, observed annually on 27 June, is a national holiday in Djibouti. It mark the territory's declaration of independence from France. An independence referendum was held in the French Territory of the Afars and the Issas on 8 May 1977 alongside elections for a Constituent Assembly. Unlike the rigged 1958 and 1967 plebiscites, this time the territory became independent as Djibouti on 27 June 1977. Independence Day is associated with military parades, fireworks, concerts, fairs, and political speeches and ceremonies, in addition to various other public and private events celebrating the history and culture of Djibouti.

Independence day celebrations have taken on livelier forms, with shops decorating their windows in the blue, green, white and the red star of the Djiboutian flag. Usual celebratory events and festivities for the day include flag-raising ceremonies, parades, cultural events, and the playing of patriotic songs.

Djibouti's Independence Day is also celebrated by the diaspora communities who live outside the country. During this special week, Radio Television of Djibouti (RTD) schedule is sprinkled with documentaries from the struggle for independence to remind the population of the heavy sacrifice paid to liberate the country.

See also
Flag of Djibouti

References
CIA World Factbook - Djibouti

Djibouti
June observances
Djiboutian culture
History of Djibouti